Haworth is a borough in Bergen County, in the U.S. state of New Jersey. As of the 2020 United States census, the borough's population was 3,343, a decrease of 39 (−1.2%) from the 2010 census count of 3,382, which in turn reflected a decline of 8 (−0.2%) from the 3,390 counted at the 2000 census.

Haworth was formed by an act of the New Jersey Legislature on February 24, 1904, from portions of both Dumont borough and Harrington Township. The borough was named for the historic village of Haworth, England.

In September 2012, Business Insider named Haworth the third-best suburb in America.

Geography
According to the United States Census Bureau, the borough had a total area of 2.34 square miles (6.05 km2), including 1.94 square miles (5.02 km2) of land and 0.40 square miles (1.03 km2) of water (17.01%).

The borough borders the Bergen County municipalities of Emerson to the northwest, Closter to the northeast, Demarest to the east, Dumont to the south, and Oradell to the west.

Demographics

2010 census

The Census Bureau's 2006–2010 American Community Survey showed that (in 2010 inflation-adjusted dollars) median household income was $135,694 (with a margin of error of +/− $17,923) and the median family income was $150,093 (+/− $20,623). Males had a median income of $128,958 (+/− $28,633) versus $62,813 (+/− $14,136) for females. The per capita income for the borough was $61,964 (+/− $8,214). About 3.3% of families and 2.5% of the population were below the poverty line, including 3.1% of those under age 18 and 2.7% of those age 65 or over.

2000 census
As of the 2000 United States census there were 3,390 people, 1,134 households, and 970 families residing in the borough. The population density was 1,732.3 people per square mile (667.8/km2). There were 1,146 housing units at an average density of 585.6 per square mile (225.8/km2). The racial makeup of the borough was 87.94% White, 1.21% African American, 9.20% Asian, 0.74% from other races, and 0.91% from two or more races. Hispanic or Latino of any race were 2.71% of the population.

There were 1,134 households, out of which 44.1% had children under the age of 18 living with them, 76.7% were married couples living together, 6.5% had a female householder with no husband present, and 14.4% were non-families. 12.8% of all households were made up of individuals, and 8.1% had someone living alone who was 65 years of age or older. The average household size was 2.98 and the average family size was 3.25.

In the borough the population was spread out, with 28.9% under the age of 18, 4.3% from 18 to 24, 23.6% from 25 to 44, 29.2% from 45 to 64, and 14.0% who were 65 years of age or older. The median age was 41 years. For every 100 females, there were 96.1 males. For every 100 females age 18 and over, there were 91.8 males.

The median income for a household in the borough was $101,836, and the median income for a family was $112,500. Males had a median income of $89,476 versus $49,643 for females. The per capita income for the borough was $45,615. About 1.8% of families and 2.0% of the population were below the poverty line, including 2.4% of those under age 18 and 1.3% of those age 65 or over.

Parks and recreation
 White Beeches Country Club features 18 holes of golf. It has hosted U.S. Open sectional qualifiers, Met Open qualifiers, and the State Open. The course was built in 1915 and designed by Walter Travis.
 Haworth Country Club is a private club, featuring 18 holes of golf. Like White Beeches, Haworth has been host to U.S. Open sectional qualifiers. Officially opened in 1965, the original course was designed by designer Toscana Filenti. In 1997, Haworth obtained full ownership of the Country Club's land from the local water company. In 2000, designer Robert Trent Jones Jr. redesigned the course.
 Haworth Swim Club is a public pool that first opened in 1957.

Government

Local government
Haworth is governed under the Borough form of New Jersey municipal government, which is used in 218 municipalities (of the 564) statewide, making it the most common form of government in New Jersey. The governing body is comprised of a Mayor and a Borough Council, with all positions elected at-large on a partisan basis as part of the November general election. A Mayor is elected directly by the voters to a four-year term of office. The Borough Council is comprised of six members elected to serve three-year terms on a staggered basis, with two seats coming up for election each year in a three-year cycle. The Borough form of government used by Haworth is a "weak mayor / strong council" government in which council members act as the legislative body with the mayor presiding at meetings and voting only in the event of a tie. The mayor can veto ordinances subject to an override by a two-thirds majority vote of the council. The mayor makes committee and liaison assignments for council members, and most appointments are made by the mayor with the advice and consent of the council.

, the Mayor of Haworth is Democrat Heather J. Wasser, whose term of office ends on December 31, 2026. Members of the Borough Council are Jacqueline S. Guenego (D, 2025), Lisa Dhamija (D, 2023; elected to serve an unexpired term), Howard Lau (D, 2024; appointed to serve an unexpired term), Glenn Z. Poosikian (D, 2024),  Andrew Rosenberg (R, 2025) and Dina Siciliano (D, 2023).

In January 2023, Howard Lau was appointed to the council seat expiring in December 2024 that was vacated by Heather Wasser when she took office as mayor.

In February 2022, the Borough Council selected Jackie Guenego from a list of three candidates nominated by the Democratic municipal committee to serve as mayor for a term expiring in December 2022 after Tom Ference stepped down from office following heart surgery. In March 2022, Lisa Dhamija was appointed to fill the council seat expiring in December 2023 that had been held by Jackie Guenego until she took office as mayor.

Federal, state and county representation
Haworth is located in the 5th Congressional District and is part of New Jersey's 39th state legislative district.

Politics
As of March 2011, there were a total of 2,319 registered voters in Haworth, of which 777 (33.5% vs. 31.7% countywide) were registered as Democrats, 519 (22.4% vs. 21.1%) were registered as Republicans and 1,023 (44.1% vs. 47.1%) were registered as Unaffiliated. There were no voters registered to other parties. Among the borough's 2010 Census population, 68.6% (vs. 57.1% in Bergen County) were registered to vote, including 95.6% of those ages 18 and over (vs. 73.7% countywide).

In the 2016 presidential election, Democrat Hillary Clinton received 1,158 votes (59.0% vs. 54.2% countywide), ahead of Republican Donald Trump with 708 votes (36.1% vs 41.1% countywide) and other candidates with 67 votes (3.4% vs 3.0% countywide), among the 1,963 ballots cast by the borough's 2,565 registered voters. for a turnout of 76.5% (vs. 73% in Bergen County). In the 2012 presidential election, Democrat Barack Obama received 992 votes (53.3% vs. 54.8% countywide), ahead of Republican Mitt Romney with 842 votes (45.2% vs. 43.5%) and other candidates with 11 votes (0.6% vs. 0.9%), among the 1,861 ballots cast by the borough's 2,451 registered voters, for a turnout of 75.9% (vs. 70.4% in Bergen County). In the 2008 presidential election, Democrat Barack Obama received 1,142 votes (57.2% vs. 53.9% countywide), ahead of Republican John McCain with 823 votes (41.2% vs. 44.5%) and other candidates with 12 votes (0.6% vs. 0.8%), among the 1,998 ballots cast by the borough's 2,445 registered voters, for a turnout of 81.7% (vs. 76.8% in Bergen County). In the 2004 presidential election, Democrat John Kerry received 1,044 votes (54.9% vs. 51.7% countywide), ahead of Republican George W. Bush with 840 votes (44.2% vs. 47.2%) and other candidates with 13 votes (0.7% vs. 0.7%), among the 1,901 ballots cast by the borough's 2,326 registered voters, for a turnout of 81.7% (vs. 76.9% in the whole county).

In the 2013 gubernatorial election, Republican Chris Christie received 61.8% of the vote (774 cast), ahead of Democrat Barbara Buono with 37.4% (469 votes), and other candidates with 0.8% (10 votes), among the 1,287 ballots cast by the borough's 2,384 registered voters (34 ballots were spoiled), for a turnout of 54.0%. In the 2009 gubernatorial election, Democrat Jon Corzine received 711 ballots cast (50.7% vs. 48.0% countywide), ahead of Republican Chris Christie with 601 votes (42.9% vs. 45.8%), Independent Chris Daggett with 69 votes (4.9% vs. 4.7%) and other candidates with 5 votes (0.4% vs. 0.5%), among the 1,401 ballots cast by the borough's 2,426 registered voters, yielding a 57.7% turnout (vs. 50.0% in the county).

Education
The Haworth Public Schools serves public school students in kindergarten through eighth grade at Haworth Public School. As of the 2019–20 school year, the district, comprised of one school, had an enrollment of 395 students and 40.0 classroom teachers (on an FTE basis), for a student–teacher ratio of 9.9:1.

Public school students in ninth through twelfth grades attend Northern Valley Regional High School at Demarest in Demarest, which serves students from Closter, Demarest and Haworth. The high school is part of the Northern Valley Regional High School District, which also serves students from Harrington Park, Northvale, Norwood and Old Tappan at Northern Valley Regional High School at Old Tappan. During the 1994–1996 school years, Northern Valley Regional High School at Demarest was awarded the Blue Ribbon School Award of Excellence by the United States Department of Education. As of the 2019–20 school year, the high school had an enrollment of 959 students and 93.4 classroom teachers (on an FTE basis), for a student–teacher ratio of 10.3:1.

Public school students from the borough, and all of Bergen County, are eligible to attend the secondary education programs offered by the Bergen County Technical Schools, which include the Bergen County Academies in Hackensack, and the Bergen Tech campus in Teterboro or Paramus. The district offers programs on a shared-time or full-time basis, with admission based on a selective application process and tuition covered by the student's home school district.

Transportation

Roads and highways

The main roads that pass through Haworth are Sunset Avenue and Schraalenburgh Road.

Public transportation
NJ Transit bus routes 167 and 177 serve the Port Authority Bus Terminal in Midtown Manhattan in New York City, and the 186 serves the George Washington Bridge Bus Terminal in Washington Heights, Upper Manhattan.

Rockland Coaches provides service on the 14ET route to the Port Authority Bus Terminal and on the 14K route to the George Washington Bridge Bus Station.

Notable people

People who were born in, residents of, or otherwise closely associated with Haworth include:

 Ruth Margery Addoms (1896–1951), botanist at Duke University specializing in the study of plant anatomy and plant physiology
 Steven Blane, Universalist rabbi and cantor who is the founder and dean of the Jewish Spiritual Leaders Institute, an online, one-year rabbinical school, and founder and spiritual leader of Sim Shalom Synagogue, an interactive Universalist cyber-synagogue
 Philip Bosco (1930–2018), actor
 Charles Abel Corwin (1857–1938), staff artist at the Field Museum of Natural History from 1903 to 1938
 John Dalley (born 1935), second violinist of the Guarneri Quartet
 Churchill Ettinger (1903–1984), painter, whose work was part of the painting event in the art competition at the 1936 Summer Olympics
 Denman Fink (1880–1956), artist and illustrator
 Lisa Friel, lawyer and prosecutor who served as chief of the sex crimes unit in the Manhattan District Attorney's office
 Raymond Garramone (1926–1998), politician who served in the New Jersey State Senate representing the 39th Legislative District and as mayor of Haworth
 Donald Genaro (born 1932), industrial designer
 J. Christopher Giancarlo (born 1959), chairman of the United States Commodity Futures Trading Commission
 Elizabeth Gillies (born 1993), actress who appeared in the Nickelodeon show Victorious
 Dick Hall (born 1930), former MLB relief pitcher
 Charles O'Connor Hennessy (1860–1936), member of the New Jersey Senate who played a major role in the borough's development
 Carl Hubbell (1903–1988), pitcher for the New York Giants
 James Gordon Irving (1913–2012), commercial illustrator and painter, best known for illustrating the early Golden Guide series of nature books
 Rudolph Isley (born 1939), founding member of The Isley Brothers
 Judith LeClair (born 1958), bassoonist
 Armin K. Lobeck (1886–1958), cartographer, geomorphologist and landscape artist
 Conal O'Brien (born 1956), soap opera director whose work has included All My Children
 Vince O'Brien (1919–2010), character actor who appeared in Annie Hall and as the Shell Answer Man
 Maureen Orcutt (1907–2007), pioneer golfer and reporter for The New York Times
 Frank C. Osmers Jr. (1907–1977), served on the Haworth Borough Council from 1930 to 1934 and as mayor in 1935 and 1936, before representing New Jersey's 9th congressional district from 1939 to 1943 and 1951–1965
 Becky Quick (born 1972), CNBC Host
 Henry Martyn Robert (1837–1923), military engineer and Brigadier general in the United States Army who was the author of Robert's Rules of Order
 Brooke Shields (born 1965), actress
 Omoyele Sowore (born 1971), Nigerian human rights activist and political prisoner
 Clark Terry (1920–2015), jazz trumpeter
 Myrtle Vail (1888–1978), radio fixture from 1932 to 1946 who performed the role of "Myrt" on the soap opera Myrt and Marge

References

Sources

 Municipal Incorporations of the State of New Jersey (according to Counties) prepared by the Division of Local Government, Department of the Treasury (New Jersey); December 1, 1958.
 Clayton, W. Woodford; and Nelson, William. History of Bergen and Passaic Counties, New Jersey, with Biographical Sketches of Many of its Pioneers and Prominent Men. Philadelphia: Everts and Peck, 1882.
 Harvey, Cornelius Burnham (ed.), Genealogical History of Hudson and Bergen Counties, New Jersey. New York: New Jersey Genealogical Publishing Co., 1900.
 Van Valen, James M. History of Bergen County, New Jersey. New York: New Jersey Publishing and Engraving Co., 1900.
 Westervelt, Frances A. (Frances Augusta), 1858–1942, History of Bergen County, New Jersey, 1630–1923, Lewis Historical Publishing Company, 1923.

External links

 Haworth Borough website
 Haworth Public School
 
 School Data for the Haworth Public School, National Center for Education Statistics
 Northern Valley Regional High School District

 
1904 establishments in New Jersey
Borough form of New Jersey government
Boroughs in Bergen County, New Jersey
Populated places established in 1904